Douglas Francis McDougall (born 21 February 1958) is a Scottish former professional footballer who played as a striker for Clydebank, St Mirren and Aberdeen in the 1970s and 1980s.

Playing career

Early career
McDougall was brought up in the Cadder neighbourhood of Glasgow and, in his teens, showed promise as a boxer. His first involvement in professional football came after Hearts manager Bobby Seith saw him in a local amateur game and signed him on a schoolboy form for the Edinburgh club.

McDougall's progress at Hearts was interrupted after an incident on a bus left him hospitalised for six months while his damaged eyesight was repaired. He later dropped to Junior level with Duntocher Hibs and Glasgow Perthshire, and despite an unsuccessful trial with Partick Thistle, signed for Clydebank in 1978.

After scoring 28 goals in the 1978–79 season for Clydebank, he was bought by St Mirren for £150,000. This was a record transfer between two Scottish clubs at the time.

Aberdeen
Aberdeen signed McDougall in 1984 from St Mirren for a transfer fee of £100,000. His 22 league goals (24 in all competitions) in his first season made him the top scorer in the Scottish Premier Division, and helped The Dons win the league championship. McDougall scored a hat-trick as Aberdeen clinched the championship with a 3–0 win at Hearts on 4 May 1985. His second season saw fewer goals, but did include a four-goal haul in a 4–1 over Celtic in November 1985. At Aberdeen, McDougall was troubled by a persistent back injury, diagnosed as traumatic spondylitis, and played his last game for Aberdeen in August 1986 against Hibernian. Six months later, as his condition did not improve, he was forced to retire on medical advice around the time of his 29th birthday.

Personal life
McDougall lived in England for a few years with his Brazilian wife before moving to Brazil, although he later returned to England.

References

External links
St Mirren F.C. profile

1958 births
Aberdeen F.C. players
Association football forwards
Clydebank F.C. (1965) players
Duntocher Hibernian F.C. players
Glasgow Perthshire F.C. players
Heart of Midlothian F.C. players
Living people
Scottish Football League players
Scottish footballers
Scottish Junior Football Association players
Footballers from Glasgow
St Mirren F.C. players
Scottish league football top scorers
People from Maryhill